Wanda is an unincorporated community in Logan County, West Virginia, United States. It is 760 feet [232 m] above sea level. and runs on the EST time zone (UTC-5). It has not been involved in any censuses, so its population is unknown/

References 

Unincorporated communities in West Virginia
Unincorporated communities in Logan County, West Virginia